The tenth season of the Russian reality talent show The Voice Kids premiered in December 2022 on Channel One. Agata Muceniece returned as the show's presenters while Yana Churikova replaced Dmitry Nagiev for the first time in the show history. Basta and Egor Kreed returned as a coach were joined by MakSim, who replaced Polina Gagarina and became as a new coach. Anna Dorovskaya was announced the winner of this season, marking Basta's second win as a coach on The Voice Kids.

Coaches and presenters

Basta and Egor Kreed returned as coaches and were joined by Maksim, who became as a new coach.

Agata Muceniece returned as the show's presenters and Yana Churikova replaced Dmitry Nagiev.

Teams
Colour key

Blind Auditions 
Blind auditions started on 9 December 2022. As like previous season, each coach has to complete its team with fifteen contestants. The coaches performed "Сансара" at the start of the show.

The Battles 
The Battles began on January 27, 2023. Contestants who won their battle advanced to the Sing-off rounds.
Colour key

The Sing-offs 
The Sing-offs started on January 27. Contestants who were saved by their coaches advanced to the Final.
Colour key

Live shows
Colour key

Week 1: Live Playoffs (February 17)
As with season 2, each coach saved three artists who were eliminated in the Sing-offs.
Playoff results were voted on in real time. Nine artists sang live and six of them were eliminated by the end of the night.
Three saved artists advanced to the Final.

Week 2: Final (February 22)

Best Coach
Colour key

Notes

References

10
2022 Russian television seasons